Original Software is a privately held company providing automatic software testing products and services.

History

Original Software was formed in December 1996 and started trading in May 1997. It was founded by Colin Armitage.

In the initial years, Original Software focused on the IBM i platform.

In 2007 a manual testing solution was introduced.

In 2010 it was listed as one of "Twenty companies to watch in 2010" by CIO UK.

Products
Original Software's solutions include:
 Qualify - an Application Quality Management (AQM) solution uniting all aspects of the software development lifecycle
 TestDrive - a test automation tool
 TestDrive-Assist - a tool for dynamic manual testing 
 TestBench - a test data management and verification tool
 TestSmart - a tool for automated creation of optimised variable data

References

External links
 

Software testing